Västernorrland County is one of the 29 multi-member constituencies of the Riksdag, the national legislature of Sweden. The constituency was established in 1970 when the Riksdag changed from a bicameral legislature to a unicameral legislature. It is conterminous with the county of Västernorrland. The constituency currently elects eight of the 349 members of the Riksdag using the open party-list proportional representation electoral system. At the 2022 general election it had 188,542 registered electors.

Electoral system
Västernorrland County currently elects eight of the 349 members of the Riksdag using the open party-list proportional representation electoral system. Constituency seats are allocated using the modified Sainte-Laguë method. Only parties that that reach the 4% national threshold and parties that receive at least 12% of the vote in the constituency compete for constituency seats. Supplementary leveling seats may also be allocated at the constituency level to parties that reach the 4% national threshold.

Election results

Summary

(Excludes leveling seats)

Detailed

2020s

2022
Results of the 2022 general election held on 11 September 2022:

The following candidates were elected:
 Constituency seats - Jörgen Berglund (M), 1,012 votes; Peder Björk (S), 1,303 votes; Peter Hedberg (S), 681 votes; David Lång (SD), 1 vote; Malin Larsson (S), 2,089 votes; Ulf Lindholm (SD), 10 votes; Anne-Li Sjölund (C), 509 votes; and Anna-Belle Strömberg (S), 1,070 votes.
 Leveling seats - Isabell Mixter (V), 561 votes.

2010s

2018
Results of the 2018 general election held on 9 September 2018:

The following candidates were elected:
 Constituency seats - Jörgen Berglund (M), 1,285 votes; Christina Höj Larsen (V), 605 votes; Emil Källström (C), 2,136 votes; Malin Larsson (S), 606 votes; Stefan Löfven (S), 10,235 votes; Ingemar Nilsson (S), 187 votes; Kristina Nilsson (S), 413 votes; and Johnny Skalin (SD), 104 votes.

2014
Results of the 2014 general election held on 14 September 2014:

The following candidates were elected:
 Constituency seats - Lena Asplund (M), 1,049 votes; Mattias Bäckström Johansson (SD), 0 votes; Susanne Eberstein (S), 2,336 votes; Eva Lohman (M), 566 votes; Ingemar Nilsson (S), 460 votes; Kristina Nilsson (S), 2,304 votes; Jasenko Omanović (S), 1,496 votes; and Eva Sonidsson (S), 550 votes.
 Leveling seats - Christina Höj Larsen (V), 424 votes; and Emil Källström (C), 1,916 votes.

2010
Results of the 2010 general election held on 19 September 2010:

The following candidates were elected:
 Constituency seats - Lena Asplund (M), 1,960 votes; Susanne Eberstein (S), 2,707 votes; Emil Källström (C), 1,268 votes; Christina Karlsson (S), 1,858 votes; Eva Lohman (M), 1,292 votes; Ingemar Nilsson (S), 343 votes; Jasenko Omanović (S), 1,428 votes; and Eva Sonidsson (S), 811 votes.
 Leveling seats - Christina Höj Larsen (V), 301 votes.

2000s

2006
Results of the 2006 general election held on 17 September 2006:

The following candidates were elected:
 Constituency seats - Lena Asplund (M), 702 votes; Susanne Eberstein (S), 1,825 votes; Bertil Kjellberg (M), 1,910 votes; Agneta Lundberg (S), 1,516 votes; Jasenko Omanović (S), 822 votes; Birgitta Sellén (C), 1,309 votes; Eva Sonidsson (S), 533 votes; Hans Stenberg (S), 1,371 votes; and Gunilla Wahlén (V), 407 votes.
 Leveling seats - Solveig Hellquist (FP), 470 votes; and Lars Lindén (KD), 532 votes.

2002
Results of the 2002 general election held on 15 September 2002:

The following candidates were elected:
 Constituency seats - Susanne Eberstein (S), 2,920 votes; Solveig Hellquist (FP), 657 votes; Bertil Kjellberg (M), 1,396 votes; Kerstin Kristiansson Karlstedt (S), 1,086 votes; Agneta Lundberg (S), 1,790 votes; Göran Norlander (S), 789 votes; Birgitta Sellén (C), 1,442 votes; Hans Stenberg (S), 1,573 votes; and Gunilla Wahlén (V), 612 votes.
 Leveling seats - Lars Lindén (KD), 1,242 votes.

1990s

1998
Results of the 1998 general election held on 20 September 1998:

The following candidates were elected:
 Constituency seats - Susanne Eberstein (S), 2,642 votes; Jan Erik Ågren (KD), 236 votes; Kerstin Kristiansson (S), 1,157 votes; Agneta Lundberg (S), 2,349 votes; Per-Richard Molén (M), 2,339 votes; Göran Norlander (S), 1,340 votes; Hans Stenberg (S), 1,716 votes; Claes Stockhaus (V), 821 votes; and Gunilla Wahlén (V), 1,215 votes.
 Leveling seats - Birgitta Sellén (C), 1,406 votes.

1994
Results of the 1994 general election held on 18 September 1994:

1991
Results of the 1991 general election held on 15 September 1991:

1980s

1988
Results of the 1988 general election held on 18 September 1988:

1985
Results of the 1985 general election held on 15 September 1985:

1982
Results of the 1982 general election held on 19 September 1982:

1970s

1979
Results of the 1979 general election held on 16 September 1979:

1976
Results of the 1976 general election held on 19 September 1976:

1973
Results of the 1973 general election held on 16 September 1973:

1970
Results of the 1970 general election held on 20 September 1970:

References

Riksdag constituencies
Riksdag constituencies established in 1970
Riksdag constituency